Two ships of the United States Navy have been named USS Sabine, after the Sabine River along the Texas/Louisiana border.

 The first  was a sailing frigate started in 1822 but not completed until 1855, and in service during the American Civil War.
 The second  was a fleet oiler purchased in 1940 and on active service until 1969.

United States Navy ship names